Nagoya Soccer Club (名古屋サッカークラブ, Nagoya Sakkākurabu) commonly known as Nagoya SC (名古屋SC, Nagoya Esushi) is a Japanese football club based in Aichi. The club has played in Japan Soccer League Division 2. Currently play in Tōkai Adult Soccer League 2, which part of Japanese Regional Leagues.

League history

Current squad
As of June 9, 2019.

Honours

Titles
Tokai Regional League
 Champions (3): : 1972, 1976, 1979.
Tokai Regional League 2
 Champions (1): : 2013.
National Sports Festival of Japan
 Champions (1): : 1961.

References

External links
Official site
Official blog

 
Football clubs in Japan
Japan Soccer League clubs
1950 establishments in Japan
Sports teams in Aichi Prefecture